Ottogi Co, Ltd. (Korean: 주식회사 오뚜기) is a food manufacturing company headquartered in Anyang, South Korea. Ottogi Center is located in Seoul and is listed on the KOSPI 200.

History 
Ottogi was founded in May 1969. Ottogi’s first product was Ottogi Curry (powder curry), and it was the first Korean-made curry product. Ottogi also manufactured soup, ketchup, and mayonnaise in 1970, 1971, and 1972, for the first time in Korean history. After Ottogi was listed on the stock market in August 1994, its total revenue exceeded 1 trillion won(￦) in 2007, exceeded 2 trillion won(￦) in 2017, and exceeded 3 trillion won(￦) in 2022. Ottogi established a branch in China in 1994, a US branch in 2005, and a Vietnam Branch in 2007. Ottogi has affiliates such as Ottogi Ramyon Co. Ltd., Ottogi Sesame Mills Co. Ltd., Ottogi Frozen Foods Co. Ltd., etc.

Main business 
Ottogi produces curry, seasoning, sauce, powder, HMR, retort pouch, dehydrated food, processed grain products, fish, livestock product, noodles, edible oils, spices, tea, and others. 

Their main products are Ottogi Curry, Ottogi Tomato Ketchup, Ottogi 3 Minutes Meals, Ottogi Mayonnaise, Ottogi Cooked Rice, Jin Ramen, Ottogi Frozen Pizza, and Ottogi Canned Tuna.

See also 

 List of South Korean companies
 Korean cuisine

References

External links 
 

 Manufacturing companies based in Seoul
 Companies based in Gyeonggi Province
Anyang, Gyeonggi
 Food manufacturers of South Korea
 Food and drink companies of South Korea
 Food and drink companies established in 1969
 Condiment companies
 South Korean companies established in 1969
 South Korean brands
 Companies listed on the Korea Exchange